Peter Brian Bromilow (21 April 1933 - 16 October 1994) was an English-born actor.

Active on stage, he made his film debut in 1967 in Camelot, playing Sir Sagramore to Vanessa Redgrave's Guenevere.

He moved to Hollywood in the 1970s, and made television guest appearances on Daniel Boone, The Virginian, The Feather and Father Gang, Remington Steele and The Wonder Years. His U.S. theatre work included playing Inspector Lestrade in Sherlock's Last Case, directed by Charles Marowitz, with the Los Angeles Actors' Theatre in 1984.

Select filmography
 Camelot (1967) - Sir Sagramore
 The Railway Children (1970) - Doctor Forrest
 Nasty Habits (1977) - Baudouin
 Semi-Tough (1977) - Kostov's Interpreter
 Cheech and Chong's Next Movie (1980) - Gay Motorcyclist
 Evita Peron (1981, TV Movie) - Capt. Gayado
 Breakin' (1984) - Judge
 Hot Chili (1985) - Herr Fritz
 Club Paradise (1986) - Nigel
 Hard Ticket to Hawaii (1987) - Mr. Chang
 Programmed to Kill (1987) - Donovan
 War and Remembrance (1988, TV Mini-Series) - Cmdr. Sutherland
 Scrooged (1988) - Archbishop
 My Stepmother Is an Alien (1988) - Second in Command
 Wild at Heart (1990) - Hotel Manager
 Highlander II: The Quickening (1991) - Joe
 The Rocketeer (1991) - Nobleman
 Delirious (1991) - Auctioneer

References

External links
 
 

English male stage actors
English male film actors
English male television actors
1933 births
1994 deaths
20th-century English male actors
British expatriate male actors in the United States